The October Coup may refer to:
 The October Revolution of 1917, when the Bolshevik Party of communists took power from the provisional government in the major cities of Russia. 
 The 1993 Russian constitutional crisis, when a legal conflict between the president and the parliament afterwards the collapse of the Soviet Union escalated into a military standoff on the streets of Moscow.